Lincolnville is an unincorporated community in Lagro Township, Wabash County, in the U.S. state of Indiana.

History

A post office was established in Lincolnville in 1865. It remained in operation until it was discontinued in 1907.

Geography

References

Unincorporated communities in Wabash County, Indiana
Unincorporated communities in Indiana